The Capture of the Green River Killer is a 2008 television miniseries that first aired on Lifetime Movie Network and tells the story of the Green River killer serial murders between 1982 and 1998.

The miniseries was named one of the top 10 television productions of 2008 by Variety and was twice nominated for a 2008 Gemini Award for best direction and for best costuming. Lifetime's premiere of The Capture of the Green River Killer delivered two million viewers, making it 10-year-old Lifetime Movie Network's most-watched telecast ever.

Background
The film is based on David Reichert's book, Chasing the Devil: My Twenty-Year Quest to Capture the Green River Killer.  The film's biggest departure from the book is a fictional inclusion of two teenage girls, one of whom, Helen "Hel" Remus, is a young runaway who decides to turn to prostitution to escape her mother's abusive boyfriend, in a sympathetic storyline to honor Ridgway's victims.  Detective Dave Reichert works the murder cases and stays on the case from beginning to end, including extensive interviews with incarcerated serial killer Ted Bundy.  In the movie he and another officer face the killer, Gary Ridgway after tracking his truck down because it was seen picking up a missing woman.

Cast
 Tom Cavanagh as Dave Reichert
 Michelle Harrison as Julie Reichert
 Amy Davidson as Helen 'Hel' Remus
 Sharon Lawrence as Fiona Remus
 Christina Lindley as Lynn Mosey
 James Marsters as Ted Bundy
 John Pielmeier as Gary Ridgway
 James Russo as Jeb Dallas
 Zak Santiago as Seth Imperia
 Maya Ritter as Teen Angela
 Brendan Fletcher as Bobby
 Currie Graham as Captain Norwell
 Jessica Harmon as Natalie 'Nat' Webley
 Aaron Hughes as Ellie's Boyfriend
 Ingrid Rogers as Det. Faye Brooks
 Bret Anthony as Bram Seton
 Dan Augusta as Young Gary Ridgway
 Paige Bannister as Colleen Brockman
 Trisha Benjamin as Marsue Haller
 Sarah Constible as Mary Meehan
 John Fasano as Joe Jakes
 Alicia Johnston as Gary's Mom
 Suzanne Kelly as Opal Mills
 Kristen Sawatzky as Ellie Slater
 Jenna Ullenboom as Wendy Coffield
 Solmund MacPherson as Boy

Music
The main music theme is taken out of the symphonic poem From Bohemia's Fields and Meadows (Z českých luhů a hájů). It is the fourth part of a set of six symphonic poems Má vlast (My Homeland) by Czech composer Bedřich Smetana.

Reception
Barry Garon of The Hollywood Reporter wrote, "Using dark colors and jarring images, director Norma Bailey tries to infuse the work with suspense and mystery. The story itself, a repetitive tale unfolding at a languid pace, impedes the effort."

References

External links
 
The Capture of the Green River Killer at Lifetime Movie Network

2000s American television miniseries
Fiction about serial killers
Cultural depictions of Ted Bundy
Lifetime (TV network) original programming